Begonia gracilis is a species of flowering plant in the family Begoniaceae. It is a small herb widespread in the mountains of Mexico, from Chihuahua to Chiapas, often growing in protected locations in shaded areas.

References

gracilis
Flora of Mexico